Queen Inyeol (16 August 1594 – 16 January 1636) of the Cheongju Han clan, was a posthumous name bestowed to the wife and first queen consort of Injo of Joseon, the 16th Joseon monarch. She was queen consort of Joseon from 1623 until her death in 1636. Her tomb is located in Paju-si, Gyeonggi-do.

Biography
Lady Han was born on 16 August 1594 into the Cheongju Han clan to Han Jun-gyeom and his wife, Lady Hwang of the Changwon Hwang clan, as their youngest child of five children. Her mother later died a few days after her birth, but Lady Han was born and raised in the town of Wonju until she married.

In 1610, she married Prince Neungyang (능양군), Injo of Joseon, when she was 17 and was known as “Princess Consort Cheongseong” (청성군부인, 淸城郡夫人). Princess Cheongseong gave birth to Crown Prince Sohyeon in 1612, Grand Prince Bongrim (later known as King Hyojong) in 1619, and Grand Prince Inpyeong in 1622.

On 24 April 1623, she became the queen consort upon her husband's ascension to the throne. The Queen gave birth to a fourth son, Prince Yongseong, in 1624, her first daughter in 1626, and a fifth son in 1629, but both died prematurely.

On 12 January 1636, she gave birth to a prince, her sixth son, who died four days later on 16 January 1636. On the same day, the Queen died at the age of 41 in Changgyeong Palace as she was suffering from postpartum illness.

Her husband, King Injo wanted to bestow Myeongheon (명헌, 明憲) as her posthumous title, but Kim Sang-heon persuaded the king to change the name into Inyeol (인열): “In” for benevolence (仁) and “Yeol” for pillar (烈).

King Injo had decided to have his own tomb be made next to the queen in Jangneung. After the king died, their son, King Hyojong granted his wish and buried his father there. Jangneung was originally located in Uncheon-ri, Paju, but when snakes and scorpions began to live and infest around the tomb, King Yeongjo moved the tomb to Galhyeon-ri, Paju.

Family
Father: Han Jun-gyeom (한준겸, 韓浚謙) (1557 – 1627)
Grandfather: Han Hyo-yun (한효윤, 韓孝胤) (1536 – 1580)
Great-grandfather: Han Yeo-pil (한여필, 韓汝弼)
Great-grandmother: Lady Yu of the Munhwa Yu clan (문화 유씨, 文化 柳氏); daughter of Yu Eom (유엄, 柳渰)
Grandmother: Lady Shin of the Pyeongsan Shin clan (평산 신씨) (1532 – 1608); daughter of Shin Geon (신건, 申健; 1493 - 1566)
 Uncle: Han Baek-gyeom (한백겸, 韓百謙) (1552 – 1615)
Cousin: Han Heung-il (한흥일, 韓興一) (1587 – 1651)
Cousin: Lady Han (한씨)
 Cousin-in-law: Hong Bi (홍비, 洪棐)
Uncle: Han Jong-gyeom (한중겸, 韓重謙) (1555 – 1579)
 Aunt: Lady Han of the Cheongju Han clan (청주 한씨, 淸州 韓氏)
 Uncle: Hong Jeok (홍적, 洪迪) of the Namyang Hong clan (1549 – 1591)
 Aunt: Lady Han of the Cheongju Han clan (청주 한씨, 淸州 韓氏)
 Uncle: Sim Heun (심흔, 沈忻)
 Aunt: Lady Han of the Cheongju Han clan (청주 한씨, 淸州 韓氏)
 Uncle: Kwon Heun (권흔, 權昕)
 Aunt: Lady Han of the Cheongju Han clan (청주 한씨, 淸州 韓氏)
 Uncle: Seo Yong-gab (서용갑, 徐龍甲)
 Aunt: Lady Han of the Cheongju Han clan (청주 한씨, 淸州 韓氏)
 Uncle: Hwang Yu-gil (황유길, 黃有吉)
 Aunt: Lady Han of the Cheongju Han clan (청주 한씨, 淸州 韓氏); died before marrying (혼인전에 사망)
Mother: Internal Princess Consort Hoesan of the Changwon Hwang clan (회산부부인 창원 황씨) (1561 – 1594)
Grandfather: Hwang Seong (황성, 黃珹)
Grandmother: Lady Yi of the Ubong Yi clan (우봉 이씨, 牛峰 李氏)
Siblings
 Older sister: Lady Han (한씨)
 Brother-in-law: Yi Yun-yeon (이윤연, 李幼淵) (1571 – 1615)
 Older brother: Han Hoe-il (한회일, 韓會一) (1580 – 1642)
 Sister-in-law: Lady Yi of the Jeonju Yi clan (전주 이씨, 全州 李氏)
Older sister: Lady Han (한씨)
 Brother-in-law: Yeo Yi-jing (여이징, 呂爾徵) (1588 – 1656)
Adoptive nephew: Yeo Seong-je (여성제); son of Yeo Yi-ryang (여이량)
Older sister: Lady Han (정부인 청주 한씨, 貞夫人 淸州 韓氏) (1588 – 1637)
 Brother-in-law: Jeong Baek-chang (정백창, 鄭百昌) (1588 – 1635)
Older brother: Han So-il (한소일, 韓昭一) (1591 – 1608)
 Sister-in-law: Lady Yu of the Jeonju Yu clan (전주 유씨, 全州 柳氏)
Younger half-sister: Lady Han (한씨)
 Brother-in-law: Yi Hwan (이환, 李煥)
Younger half-sister: Lady Han (현부인 청주 한씨, 縣夫人 淸州 韓氏) (1612 – 1637)
 Brother-in-law: Yi Se-wan, Prince Jinwon (이세완 진원군) (1603 – 1655)
Husband: Injo of Joseon (7 December 1595 – 17 June 1649) (조선 인조)
 Mother-in-law - Queen Inheon of the Neungseong Gu clan (17 April 1578 – 14 January 1626) (인헌왕후 구씨)
 Father-in-law - Wonjong of Joseon (2 August 1580 – 29 December 1619) (조선 원종)
Issue
Son: Yi Wang, Crown Prince Sohyeon (5 February 1612 – 21 May 1645) (이왕 소현세자)
Daughter-in-law: Crown Princess Minhoe of the Geumcheon Kang clan (1611 – 30 April 1646) (민회빈 강씨)
Son: Yi Ho, King Hyojong (3 July 1619 – 23 June 1659)
Daughter-in-law: Queen Inseon of the Deoksu Jang clan (9 February 1619 – 19 March 1674) (인선왕후 장씨)
Son: Yi Yo, Grand Prince Inpyeong (10 December 1622 – 13 May 1658) (이요 인평대군)
Daughter-in-law: Princess Consort Bokcheon of the Dongbok Oh clan (22 April 1622 – 6 August 1658) (복천부부인 동복 오씨) 
Son: Yi Gon, Grand Prince Yongseong (24 October 1624 – 22 December 1629) (이곤 용성대군)
Unnamed daughter (1626 – 1626)
Unnamed son (1629 – 1629)
Unnamed son (12 January 1635 – 16 January 1635)

In popular culture
Portrayed by Seo Woo-rim in the 1981 KBS1 TV Series Daemyeong.
Portrayed by Kim Do-yeon in the 1986–1987 MBC TV series Namhansanseong Fortress 
Portrayed by Lee Seung-ha in the 2015 MBC TV series Splendid Politics

References

17th-century Korean people
1594 births
1636 deaths
Royal consorts of the Joseon dynasty
Korean queens consort
Cheongju Han clan
Han clans
Deaths in childbirth
17th-century Korean women